Events from the year 1655 in Sweden

Incumbents
 Monarch – Charles X Gustav

Events
 The King summon the 1655 Riksdag and introduces a Reduction (Sweden) of a quarter of all lands granted to the nobility from the crown since 1632.
 Deluge (history)
 23 August - Battle of Sobota
 16 September - Battle of Żarnów
 September 20 – September 30 - Battle of Nowy Dwór Mazowiecki
 3 October - Battle of Wojnicz

Births

 January - Cornelius Anckarstjerna, admiral (died 1714) 
 Charles XI of Sweden, monarch (died 1697) 
 
 

 David von Krafft, painter (died 1724)

Deaths

 28 March - Maria Eleonora of Brandenburg, queen dowager (born 1595) 
 Anna Ovena Hoyer, writer (born 1584) 
 Christian Thum, actor and theater director (birth year unknown)

References

 
Years of the 17th century in Sweden
Sweden